USS Kingfisher is a name used by four ships of the U.S. Navy:

  was a bark purchased by the Navy at Boston, Massachusetts, 2 August 1861.
 , a motor launch, was built in 1916 by George Lawley & Sons, Neponset, Massachusetts.
  launched 30 March 1918 by Puget Sound Naval Shipyard, Puget Sound, Washington.
  is the sixth ship of Osprey-class coastal minehunters.

United States Navy ship names